Michael Jacobs Productions is an inactive American production company located at Walt Disney Studios in Burbank, California. It was founded in 1978 by Michael Jacobs.

By 1989, the company had reached a film and television producing deal with The Walt Disney Studios. Previously, Jacobs had a development deal with Tri-Star Pictures for a development of a comedy project on NBC, a pact that lasted up until 1989.

Films produced
As Seen Through These Eyes (2007)
Quiz Show (1994)

TV series produced
Boy Meets World (ABC; 1993–2000)
Charles in Charge (CBS; 1984–1990)
Dinosaurs (ABC; 1991–1994)
Girl Meets World (Disney Channel; 2014–2017)
Lost at Home (ABC; 2003)
Maybe This Time (ABC; 1995–1996)
Misery Loves Company (FOX; 1995)
My Two Dads (NBC; 1987–1990)
No Soap, Radio (ABC; 1982)
The Sinbad Show (FOX, 1993–1994) 
Singer & Sons (NBC; 1990)
The Torkelsons (NBC; 1991–1993)
Together We Stand (CBS; 1986–1987)
Where I Live (ABC; 1993)
You Wish (ABC; 1997–1998)
Zoe, Duncan, Jack and Jane (WB; 1999–2000)

See also
 Walt Disney Studios (Burbank)

References

https://archive.today/20130710162434/http://edu.passionriver.com/films/view/28

External links

Film production companies of the United States
Television production companies of the United States
Entertainment companies based in California
Entertainment companies established in 1978
1978 establishments in California